Plagiotropis is a genus of planthoppers belonging to the family Delphacidae.

Species:
 Plagiotropis misandros Emeljanov, 1993

References

Delphacidae